Guilt by Association Vol. 3 is a compilation album released November 15, 2011 by Engine Room Recordings. Like its previous installments, Guilt by Association Vol. 1 and Guilt by Association Vol. 2, Guilt By Association Vol. 3 features indie rock artists covering popular rock songs.

Overview
In this, the third in the series of compilations released by Engine Room Recordings, Guilt by Association Vol. 3 features indie rock artists, including Canon Logic, Gold Lake and Helmet, covering their favorite guilty pleasure songs.  Special to this part of the series is an added theme within a theme. All the songs on this album are covers of famous 80's hair metal tracks by such bands as Ratt and Cinderella. Conceived and compiled by Engine Room Recordings, the album brings together a variety of artists in the indie scene. Since its release, Guilt by Association Vol. 3 has received rave  reviews.

Track listing

See also
Guilt by Association Vol. 1
Guilt by Association Vol. 2

References

External links
Official Myspace of GbA
Official website by Engine Room Recordings
Official Facebook fanpage

2011 compilation albums
Covers albums
Engine Room Recordings albums